Ri Jong-hwa (born October 10, 1990) is a North Korean weightlifter.

References

1990 births
Living people
North Korean female weightlifters
Weightlifters at the 2014 Asian Games
Asian Games medalists in weightlifting
Asian Games gold medalists for North Korea
Medalists at the 2014 Asian Games
World Weightlifting Championships medalists
21st-century North Korean women